The discography of Malice Mizer, a Japanese visual kei rock band formed by Mana and Közi in August 1992. Malice Mizer's earlier music and themes were characterized by their strong French and classical influences, but they later incorporated Gothic-Victorian aspects after several tragedies befell the band. They went on an indefinite hiatus on December 11, 2001.

Albums and EPs

Demos

Singles

Videography

Discography
Discographies of Japanese artists
Rock music group discographies